Pat O'Neill is a retired Irish sportsperson.  He played hurling with his local club  Cappawhite and with the Tipperary senior inter-county team from 1987 until 1988.
He captained the Tipperary team that won the 1988 National Hurling League, starting the final against Offaly at right half forward and scoring two goals and a point. He was also captain when Tipperary won the Munster Senior Hurling Championship in 1988 and was an unused substitute in the 1988 All-Ireland Senior Hurling Championship Final.

There was a period of controversy in Tipperary Hurling at that time. "Babs" Keating, the Tipperary manager, elected to drop Pat O'Neill and strip him of the captaincy for the 1988 All-Ireland Senior Hurling Championship Final and replace him with marquee forward Nicky English. It was believed that Keating felt that the smoother Nicky English was more suited to team media duties. The image of Third Level Educated University College Cork Graduate Nicky English as an All Ireland winning captain was expected to find greater favour in the corporate world. This would be in contrast to Pat O'Neill better known as Pa O'Neill who was deemed too countryish in his demeanour. Alas, there was to be no luck for the decision, and Tipperary lost the All Ireland Final to Galway.

References

External links
GAA Info Profile

Teams

Living people
Cappawhite hurlers
Tipperary inter-county hurlers
Year of birth missing (living people)